Island Hermitage on (Polgasduwa) Dodanduwa Island, Galle District, Sri Lanka is a famous Buddhist forest monastery founded by Ven Nyanatiloka Mahathera in 1911. It’s a secluded place for Buddhist monks to study and meditate in the Buddhist tradition. It also has an English and German library.

The Island Hermitage was the first centre of Theravāda Buddhist study and practice set up by and for Westerners. Its residents, monks and laymen, studied Theravada Buddhism and the Pali language, made translations of Pali scriptures, wrote books on Theravada Buddhism and practiced meditation.  The Island Hermitage once formed an essential link with Theravāda Buddhism in the West.

In 1951 Nyanatiloka moved to the Forest Hermitage in Kandy, then joined by Nyanaponika. Since 2003, the hermitage is run by a group of young Sri Lankan monks. Currently there is only one western monk who has been living here for about four years.

Location 
The Hermitage is located in Ratgama Lake, a salt-water lagoon about two kilometers from the coast near Dodanduwa. It is 105 kilometers south of Sri Lanka's principal city, Colombo, and about 12 kilometers north of the provincial capital, Galle.

The hermitage consists of two islands: Polgasduwa and Metiduwa (or Meddeduwa මැද්දෙදූව හෝ මැටිදූව). It is characterised by rich jungle vegetation and abundant bird, animal and reptile life. It is a peaceful place on an island in the large Bolgoda Lake, which is about two-and-a-half miles across and brackish as it connects with the sea. The terrain of the island is mostly flat or slightly undulating. The highest point is about 5 meters above sea level. On Metiduwa the vegetation consists of scrub and small trees such as cinnamon and bombu, with mangrove and palm trees growing along the water's edge. On the higher ground at Parapaduwa there are larger trees such as mahagoney, mango and jak. There is a noisy breeding colony of egrets, night herons and cormorants and also a colony of flying foxes. There are many mongoose and monitor lizards on the islands.

Being situated an island in a lagoon, the climate is quite hot and humid, but a fully grown canopy layer of the forest provides a comfortable environment for the meditators.

History 

Among the early Western residents were the Venerables Vappo, Mahanama, Assaji and Bhaddiya. The founder dāyaka (lay supporter) was William Mendis Wijesekera. He and other lay supporters from around Dodanduwa conveyed alms-food and other requisites to the hermitage by boat every morning. In 1913 a dānasāla (refectory) was constructed.

It was not until 1914 that the Island Polgasduwa actually came into the legal possession of the Sangha, when it was bought and donated by Ven. Nyanatiloka's Swiss supporter, Monsieur Bergier. Since that time, though interrupted by two world wars, Western as well as Sinhalese monks and laymen have lived, studied, practiced, and spread the Dhamma from the Island Hermitage.

At the outbreak of World War I in 1914, the German monks were first permitted to stay at the Island Hermitage under surveillance. However, after four months, they were taken into civil internment in Sri Lanka and then sent to Australia. When Ven. Nyanatiloka was finally able to return to Sri Lanka in 1926, he found his beloved Island Hermitage in utter ruin and had to rebuild it anew.

As soon as the restoration was completed and the hermitage was making progress again, the Second World War broke out in 1939. Ven. Nyanatiloka and his German disciples were again interned in camps, first in Sri Lanka and then in India. They were allowed to return in 1946. This time the Hermitage remained in a well preserved and in an even improved condition. It now included the adjacent small island of Metiduwa which had already been used for some time but was now officially donated by Lady Evadne de Silva, a long-time supporter of Ven. Nyanatiloka.

A detailed account of the history of the Island Hermitage and the monks who lived on it can be found in The Life of Nyanatiloka Thera: The Biography of a Western Buddhist Pioneer, Bhikkhu Nyanatusita & Hellmuth Hecker, Kandy 2008.

Chapter House or Sīmā 

The chapter house which is built on lake is the place where the community of monks, particularly gather to listen Pātimokkha recitation on a fortnightly basis as well as to perform other monastic procedures as the need arises.

Lifestyle 
All the monastics at the Island Hermitage practice walking for alms on a daily basis except for the full moon day when they are fed by devotees who come to observe precepts.

Visiting 
Tourists and short term visitors are not allowed to visit the hermitage. Long term visitors, i.e. those who like to stay at least two or three weeks, need to write in advance.

Wildlife 
There is hardly any danger on the island from animals. There are no elephants, tigers or dragons. However, do not walk outside at night without a light - even in front of the kuti. Centipede stings can cause severe pain. There are some snakes (most of them already digested by the mongooses). The iguanas (big lizards / small Dinosaurs) keep discreetly to themselves, but are capable of whipping you with their tails if you chance to step over one lying on the path.

Library 
The library at the Island Hermitage is a large Buddhist library based on a wide variety of Buddhist and non-Buddhist collections, books suitable for study for those living within a forest monastic environment. One of the most notable aspects of the library is that it has amassed a collection of the Pāli Canon in six different scripts i.e. Sinhalese, Thai, Burmese, Devanagari, Roman and German.
Its core collection lies in the areas of reference works such as encyclopedias of Buddhism, creative works, manuscripts, periodical publications including magazines, journals and books and other historical reports regarding resident monks etc. Therefore, Island Hermitage library can be seen as a place where a beginner to Buddhism can read about the basics and a scholar can carry out his research. Over the course of its history, the library’s collection has grown to include a proliferation of books on all subjects. There seems to have been an effective record-keeping practice that ensured the growth of the library by late Western monks who lived here. Unfortunately, many collections of records are believed to have been destroyed over the years due to poor maintenance. Almost all the items in the library have not been digitized and are only available in physical form.

The Island Hermitage library was long housed in the main building of the monastery, but in 2016 repairs to the damaged building were successfully carried out in order to protect and unify its vast collection. As of 2018, the library has been rehoused in an air-conditioned room and opened for both local and foreign monks and laity to carry out their researches.

Swimming 
It is not advisable to swim. If you really want to, do not swallow the water. Be particularly cautious of Oyster-shells which can cut the feet when walking in or out of the water. If an iguana (Kabara Goya in Sinhalese) is nearby, swim very quietly without moving the water too much (breast-stroke is the best) to the shore and get out. They are known to bite swimmers.

Abbots 
 Venerable Nyanatiloka: 1911–1957
 Venerable Nyanaloka: 1957–1976
 Venerable Anuragoda Piyaratana Mahathera: 1976–1994 (?)
 Venerable Rakkhita
 Venerable Nyanasanta
 Venerable Gangodawila Muditamano 
 Venerable Rajgama Vivekavihārī

Non-Destructive Book Scanning Project 
Currently, a group of monks from the Galduwa tradition, under the patronage of the current abbot, are working on a project to non-destructively digitally scan and preserve the antique books in the library. Not being an automated process, it is a somewhat time-consuming and dull technique. Bindings of the books are not removed and the books are scanned non-intrusively two pages at a time for the purpose of converting into digital ebook files later. Moreover, this project aims at developing an electronic catalogue database of the library's contents in order to retrieve the data efficiently for research work and to keep the collection intact.

Well-known Monastic Residents 
 
 Venerable Mahinda (Sikkimese) — a famous poet in the Sinhalese language, his poems are still included in Sinhalese school books.
 Venerable Nyanadhara (German).
 Venerable Nyanaponika (German) — closest disciple of Ven. Nyanatiloka, the editor of his works, and his literary heir. He wrote Heart of Buddhist Meditation and established the Buddhist Publication Society in Kandy.
 Venerable Nyanasatta (Czechoslovakian) — had several publications in Esperanto as well as English to his credit.
 Venerable Soma (Sri Lankan) — known for his scholarly works, in his later years his thoughts turned more to poetry.
 Venerable Ñāṇamoli  (English) — a great scholar and translator of some of the most difficult Pali texts of Theravada Buddhism. His magnum opus was the translation of Buddhaghosa's Visuddhimagga, a famous commentary. 
 Venerable Ñāṇavīra (English) — well known as the author of Notes on Dhamma.
 Venerable Nyanavimala (German) — especially known for his walking tour (carika) throughout Sri Lanka for 25 years.
 Bhikkhu Ñāṇajīvako (Serbo-Croatian) — writer and philosopher.
 Venerable Bodhesako (American) — writer and editor of Ven. Ñāṇavīra's works. He wrote Change and established the Path Press.
 Venerable Ñāṇananda (Sri Lankan) — known for his books such as Concept and Reality.

See also 
 Nyanatiloka Mahathera
 Nyanaponika Thera
 Ñāṇamoli Bhikkhu
 Ñāṇavīra Thera
 Samanera Bodhesako
 Katukurunde Nyanananda Thera
 Sri Kalyani Yogasrama Samstha
 Buddhist Publication Society
 Pariyatti (bookstore)
 Path Press

References
The Life of Nyanatiloka Thera: The Biography of a Western Buddhist Pioneer, Bhikkhu Nyanatusita & Hellmuth Hecker, Kandy 2008.

Buddhist monasteries in Sri Lanka
Theravada Buddhist monasteries